Lois Kathleen Joel (born 2 June 1999) is an English footballer who plays as a defender for London City Lionesses. Joel has represented England internationally at under-17 and under-19 level.

Early life
Joel grew up in the London suburb of North Finchley and attended St Michael's Catholic Grammar School. She played football in the youth systems of Watford and Arsenal before joining the Chelsea academy and was a member of the team that won the 2016–17 FA WSL Academy League Southern Division title. She was involved in one senior matchday squad, an unused substitute on 2 July 2016 as Chelsea were eliminated by second-tier London Bees on penalties in the first round of the 2016 WSL Cup.

College career
In August 2017, Joel enrolled at West Virginia University. She played college soccer for two seasons with the West Virginia Mountaineers, making 33 appearances all as a substitute and scoring one goal and one assist. The Mountaineers won the 2018 Big 12 Conference Women's Soccer Tournament and earned berths to the NCAA College Cup both years.

In May 2019, Joel transferred to North Carolina to play for the Tar Heels. She was signed on the recommendation of England youth national team teammates Lotte Wubben-Moy and Alessia Russo who had been with the Tar Heels since 2017. Having played multiple positions with West Virginia, Joel was noted by head coach Anson Dorrance for her pace, fitness and versatility. In her first season with the team, Joel made 25 appearances including eight starts and registered eight assists. The Tar Heels won both the 2019 ACC regular season and 2019 ACC Tournament, and finished runners-up in the 2019 NCAA College Cup final.

Club career

West Ham United
On 2 October 2020, Joel returned to England amid uncertainty around the US college season due to the COVID-19 pandemic and signed a short-term contract with FA WSL team West Ham United. She signed on non-contract terms in order to preserve her final year of college eligibility. She made her debut on 18 October as a 73rd-minute substitute for Laura Vetterlein in a 4–2 WSL loss to Manchester United. Ahead of the 2021–22 season, Joel signed a one-year contract extension.

International career

Youth
Joel has represented England at under-17 and under-19 level. She competed at the 2016 UEFA Women's Under-17 Championship as England topped the group by winning all three of their group stage games before losing to Germany in the semi-finals. They beat Norway in the third-place playoff, qualifying the team for the 2016 FIFA U-17 Women's World Cup in Jordan. Joel made one appearance at the World Cup in a 3–0 quarter-final defeat to eventual winners Japan.

On 18 October 2017, Joel scored her first international goal at under-19 level during a 9–0 win over Kazakhstan in 2018 UEFA Women's Under-19 Championship qualification.

Career statistics

Honors

College
West Virginia Mountaineers
Big 12 Conference Women's Soccer Tournament: 2018

North Carolina Tar Heels
Atlantic Coast Conference regular season: 2019
ACC Women's Soccer Tournament: 2019
NCAA Division I College Cup runners-up: 2019

References

External links 

Lois Joel at West Ham United

1999 births
Living people
Footballers from Finchley
English women's footballers
Women's association football defenders
West Virginia Mountaineers women's soccer players
North Carolina Tar Heels women's soccer players
West Ham United F.C. Women players
Women's Super League players
England women's youth international footballers